The New Superintendent is a 1911 American short drama film directed by  Francis Boggs, featuring Hoot Gibson as an extra.

Cast
 Herbert Rawlinson
 Tom Santschi
 Fred Huntley
 George Hernandez
 Nick Cogley
 Edward H. Philbrook
 Major J.A. McGuire as J. McGuire
 Frank Opperman
 Iva Shepard
 Elaine Davis
 Jane Keckley
 Hoot Gibson as Extra (uncredited)

See also
 Hoot Gibson filmography

References

External links

1911 films
Silent American drama films
1911 short films
American silent short films
1911 drama films
American black-and-white films
1910s American films